USS Topeka, named after the state capital Topeka, Kansas, may be any one of these United States Navy ships:

, a gunboat bought in England 1898, originally built as Diogenes by Howaldtswerke in Kiel and in periodic use until 1929.
, a light cruiser of World War II, recommissioned in 1960 as the guided missile cruiser CLG-8, with service in the Vietnam War before decommissioning in 1969.
, a  nuclear attack submarine, commissioned in 1989 and still on active service.

United States Navy ship names
Topeka, Kansas